Turkey competed at the 1956 Summer Olympics in Melbourne, Australia and Stockholm, Sweden (equestrian events).

Medalists

Nations at the 1956 Summer Olympics
1956
1956 in Turkish sport